Seanan McGuire (pronounced SHAWN-in; born January 5, 1978, in Martinez, California) is an American author and filker. McGuire is known for her urban fantasy novels. She uses the pseudonym Mira Grant to write science fiction/horror and the pseudonym A. Deborah Baker to write the "Up-and-Under" children's portal fantasy series.

In 2010, she was awarded the John W. Campbell Award for Best New Writer by the World Science Fiction Convention. Her 2016 novella Every Heart a Doorway received a Nebula Award, Hugo Award, Locus Award, and Alex Award.

In 2013, McGuire received a record five Hugo nominations in total, two for works as Grant and three under her own name.

Biography 
McGuire was born in California and attended University of California, Berkeley. She currently lives in Washington State.

She has described her interests as including "swamps, long walks, long walks in swamps, things that live in swamps, horror movies, strange noises, musical theater, reality TV, comic books, finding pennies on the street, and venomous reptiles."

McGuire frequently posts online about roleplaying games, My Little Pony, and caring for her menagerie of cats. Before becoming a full-time writer, she worked at a reptile rescue organization.

She identifies as pansexual, bisexual, and demisexual and writes numerous queer characters into her work.

McGuire is of partial Romani descent.

Professional career 
McGuire has published filk music, poetry, short fiction, essays, and novels. Most follow speculative fiction themes of fantasy, science fiction, and horror.

Her earliest publication was a contribution to the June 2002 poetry anthology Speculon. She produced the musical album Pretty Little Dead Girl in 2006 and published her first short story to the Edge of Propinquity in 2008.

Rosemary and Rue was her first published novel, released in 2009. She published Feed under the pseudonym Mira Grant in 2010, thus establishing herself as an urban fantasy writer and her Grant persona as a horror/science fiction writer.

Her longest-running series is the October Daye books, which began in 2009 with Rosemary and Rue. Sixteen books are currently available and the next installment is planned for September 2023.

In 2018, McGuire began writing for Marvel Comics. She is the author of the Spider-Gwen series and has contributed to several other franchises.

Notable works

Series 

 October Daye
 InCryptid
 Wayward Children
 Alchemical Journeys
 Newsflesh (as Mira Grant)
 Parisitology (as Mira Grant)
 Up-and-Under (as A. Deborah Baker)

Franchise tie-ins 

 Star Wars: Canto Bight anthology (contributor, as Mira Grant)
 Marvel's Spider-Gwen comics
 Deadlands: Boneyard
 Overwatch: Declassified
 Magic: The Gathering short stories

Short fiction 
McGuire's short fiction has been published in Apex Magazine, Nightmare Magazine, Lightspeed Magazine, and others. Her works appear in anthologies edited by Charlaine Harris, Jim Butcher, and John Joseph Adams.

She has self-published hundreds of short stories. From 2008-2017, she posted installments of the Velveteen series to LiveJournal with the support of fan sponsorships. Tie-ins to her October Daye and InCryptid series are available for free on her website. In 2016, she launched a Patreon account to post monthly short stories for her subscribers.

Anticipated releases 

 InCryptid #12: Backpacking Through Bedlam (March 7, 2023)
 Instinct: An Animal Rescuers Anthology (March 7, 2023)
 Magic: Soul and Stone (July 11, 2023)
 October Daye #17: Sleep No More (September 2023)
 Overwatch: Declassified. Blizzard Entertainment (October 10, 2023)

Awards and nominations

Literary awards 
McGuire holds the record for most Hugo Award nominations in a single year, with five nominations in 2013. McGuire was the first author to win the American Library Association's Alex Awards for two consecutive years. She has been nominated for the Hugo Award for Best Series every year since its inception in 2017.

In 2010, Feed was recognized as #74 out of the 100 top thriller novels of all time by NPR. It was also recognized as a Publishers Weekly Best Books of 2010.

In 2012, McGuire (as Mira Grant) was inducted in to the Darrell Awards Hall of Fame for the best American Mid-South regional speculative fiction.

Filk awards 
Pegasus Award presented by the Ohio Valley Filk Festival.

References

External links 

 SeananMcGuire.com
 
 
 Mira Grant at LC Authorities, with 4 records

1978 births
20th-century American LGBT people
21st-century American novelists
21st-century American short story writers
21st-century American women writers
21st-century American LGBT people
American comics writers
American fantasy writers
American horror novelists
American LGBT novelists
American women novelists
American women short story writers
Bisexual musicians
Bisexual women
Female comics writers
Filkers
Hugo Award-winning writers
John W. Campbell Award for Best New Writer winners
LGBT comics creators
LGBT people from California
Living people
Marvel Comics people
Marvel Comics writers
Nebula Award winners
Novelists from California
Pansexual women
People from Martinez, California
Urban fantasy writers
Women horror writers
Women science fiction and fantasy writers
Writers from the San Francisco Bay Area
Romani writers
21st-century pseudonymous writers
Pseudonymous women writers
American bisexual writers
Demisexual people
American people of Romani descent